Wacky Races is a media franchise containing four animated series, several video games, and a comic book, with most centered on the theme of various Hanna-Barbera cartoon characters primarily engaged in auto racing (although occasionally employing other means of transportation), usually in odd vehicles and with absurd plot developments.

Television
Wacky Races (1968 TV series), the original TV series
The Perils of Penelope Pitstop, a spin-off featuring  Penelope Pitstop and the Ant Hill Mob
Dastardly and Muttley in Their Flying Machines, a spin-off featuring Dick Dastardly and Muttley
Wacky Races (2017 TV series), a reboot of the original 1968 series

Video games 

Wacky Races (1991 video game), by Atlus for NES
Wacky Races (2000 video game), by Appaloosa for PlayStation, Windows and Game Boy Color
Wacky Races/Wacky Races: Starring Dastardly and Muttley 2000/2001, by Infogrames for Dreamcast and PlayStation 2
Wacky Races: Mad Motors, 2007, by Coyote and Blast! for PlayStation 2
Wacky Races: Crash and Dash, 2008, by Eidos for Nintendo DS and Wii

Other
Wacky Raceland, a comic book series envisioning the original racers in a more comic-book realistic style
Wacky Races: The Board Game, 2019, by CMON, Inc.
Hanna-Barbera franchises
Wacky Races